Eagle Harbor is a small harbor in Door County in the U.S. state of Wisconsin. It is located on the eastern side of Green Bay, an arm of Lake Michigan. The harbor is approximately 2.5 square miles in area.

Ephraim, Wisconsin, is located on the east side of Eagle Harbor. Peninsula State Park has a coastline on the harbor.

References 

Ports and harbors of Wisconsin
Bodies of water of Door County, Wisconsin